is a city in Osaka Prefecture, Japan. As of February 2017, the city had an estimated population of 103,028 and a population density of 4,700 persons per km2. The total area is 22.09 km2.

History
In the Edo period, Ikeda had a castle occupied by a daimyō, the seat of a 50,000-koku domain. It was famous for Ikeda-zumi (Ikeda charcoal) traded by Ikeda merchants. In cha no yu Ikeda-zumi is loved because of its high quality even today.

The city was founded formally on April 29, 1939. It was developed as an urban town by a local railway company, Hankyu Dentetsu. Its founder Kobayashi Ichizo (Itsuo) lived there.

On June 8, 2001, the Osaka school massacre occurred in this city. A man entered an elementary school and fatally stabbed eight children in the school. Many pupils have suffered post-traumatic stress disorder. To avoid flashback memories of the massacre and to improve school security, the buildings were remodeled and subsequently occupied in April 2004. On September 14, 2004, Mamoru Takuma was executed for the murders.

Neighboring municipalities
Osaka Prefecture
 Toyono
 Minoh
 Toyonaka
Hyōgo Prefecture
Itami
Kawanishi

Attractions
Ikeda boasts several cultural attractions: the Itsuō Art Museum holds the Itsuo Collection which is mainly Japanese art for cha-no-yu; Ikeda Bunko holds collections on Takarazuka and other materials related to Hankyu Dentetsu. There is a municipal zoo named Satsukiyama Zoo. It is home to the Momofuku Ando Instant Ramen Museum.

Transportation

Airports
Osaka International Airport (also known as Itami Airport) is in nearby Itami and Toyonaka

Railways
Hankyu Railway
Takarazuka Line: Ikeda Station – Ishibashi Station
Minoo Line: Ishibashi Station

Highway
National highways

Expressways
 Chūgoku-Ikeda Interchange
 Hanshin Expressway Ikeda Route

Major company headquarters

Daihatsu has maintained a factory since the late 1930s and the main office was established during the 1960s.
Ikeda Bank
Toyosu Co Ltd, produces and sells rice confectionery and related products.
JAL Express has its headquarters on the grounds of Osaka International Airport and in Ikeda.
Ricoh
Goshun Sake Brewery which produces Itami sake
Ikeda mandarin oranges have been grown in the region since the Meiji Era

Sister cities
Ikeda is twinned with:
 Launceston, Australia (1965)
 Penticton, Canada (1977)
 Suzhou, China (1981)

Notable people from Ikeda
Ichirō Nagai, former voice actor
Tomoki Hasegawa, Japanese composer and arranger of music (anime soundtracks)
Chiyo Okumura, Japanese pop singer
Yūko Tanaka, actress
Kamon Iizumi, governor
Hirai Kawato, Japanese professional wrestler, currently signed to New Japan Pro-Wrestling (NJPW)
Kensuke Tanabe, Japanese video game designer, producer and director (Nintendo, Senior Officer at Nintendo EPD)
Asahisato Kenji, former sumo wrestler
Daidō Moriyama, Japanese photographer
Shigeo Okumura, Japanese professional wrestler, currently based in Mexico (Mexico City, Mexico)
Yuko Nakanishi, Japanese Butterfly swimmer
Ineko Arima, Japanese film actress
Koki Ando, President and CEO of Nissin Foods and son of Momofuku Ando (the founder of Nissin Food Products Co., Ltd., the inventor of instant noodles and the creator of the brands Top Ramen and Cup Noodles)
Ayumi Ishida, singer and actress (born in Sasebo, Nagasaki and raised in Ikeda, Osaka) 
Tamiki Wakaki, Japanese mangaka (The World God Only Knows)
Atsuko Seta, Japanese classical pianist
Kazue Akita, Japanese singer and former member of J-pop girlgroup SDN48
Masayuki Naoshima, Japanese politician of the Democratic Party of Japan and member of the House of Councillors in the Diet (national legislature)
Yoshiomi Tamai, Japanese activist, philanthropist, and educator (founder of Ashinaga)

References

External links
 Ikeda City website 

 
Cities in Osaka Prefecture